Minsheng Life Insurance Company is one of China's largest insurance companies and one of the six national insurers supervised by China Insurance Regulatory Commission. Its headquarters are in Beijing, China. It provides integrated insurance services, such as life insurance, property insurance and reinsurance.

As of 2012, Minsheng Life employs over 40,000 employees and has established 23 provincial-level subsidiary companies, including Beijing, Zhejiang, Jiangsu, Hebei, Shandong, Fujian, Liaoning, Sichuan, Henan, Shanghai, Heilongjiang, Hunan, Jiangxi, Anhui, Guangxi, Shaanxi, Hubei, Shanxi etc.

Asset Management

Established in 2012, Minsheng Tonghui Asset Management is a wholly owned subsidiary and operates as the asset management arm of Minsheng Life Insurance. It is one of China's largest asset management companies funded by insurance institutions.

On July 14, 2014, Minsheng Tonghui Asset Management acquired ZheShang Fund Management Co., Ltd, helping Minsheng Life to become the second insurance company in China  to enter the field of mutual funds since the promulgation of the measure on piloting the establishment of fund management arms by insurance institutions in 2013.

References 

Companies based in Beijing
Financial services companies established in 2003
Life insurance companies of China
Chinese brands
China Minsheng Bank